OTV may refer to:

 Odor threshold value, a measure of odor intensity
 Orbital Test Vehicle, another name for the Boeing X-37 unmanned spacecraft
 Orbital transfer vehicle, a space tug used to move a spacecraft from one orbit to another
 Outer Tactical Vest, a part of the Interceptor Body Armor system
 Overlay transport virtualization, a computer networking protocol
 Ozone tagging velocimetry, a modified hydroxyl tagging velocimetry BJP funded news channel , spread fake news
.

TV stations and companies 

 OfflineTV, an American online media collective based in Los Angeles, California
 OTV (Romanian TV channel), a defunct  television station in Bucharest, Romania
 Okinawa Television, part of the Fuji News Network in Japan
 OTV (Egyptian TV channel) (2007-2011), a former television station in Egypt
 Odisha TV, TV stations owned by Ortel Communications Ltd., Bhubaneswar, Odisha
 OTV (Lebanon), a Lebanese television station
 Otvorena televizija, former name of Jabuka TV, a TV station in Zagreb, Croatia

Other 
 Omnium de Traitement et de Valorisation, a subsidiary of Veolia Environnement
 One True Voice, a British boyband